Windows Media Player is a media player and media library application by Microsoft.

WMP may also refer to:

Warner Music Poland, a record label
Wealth management product, a financial product sold in China
West Midlands Police, a police force in England
Western Malayo-Polynesian languages, a group of languages
Whole milk powder, a manufactured dairy product
World Matchplay (darts), a professional darts tournament
Mampikony Airport (IATA: WMP), an airport in Madagascar